Lechia Zielona Góra  is a Polish football club located in Zielona Góra, Poland. The team's colors are blue and yellow.
In 2012 the club merged with the local academy UKP Zielona Góra, dropping the historic Lechia name and temporarily competed under the sponsor's name Stelmet Zielona Góra but the club eventually folded in 2015. The club formed the basis of a new club Falubaz Zielona Góra; in 2019 the football club Lechia was reactivated on its basis in turn.

History  
In 1946 at a car and bridge factory one of the first football clubs in Zielona Góra was established, the Workers' Sports Club "Wagmo" (short for "Wagons and Bridges" - the name of the factory, which was the progenitor of "Zastal"). During the reorganization of the sport, the club joined the "Stal" association in 1951, although the clubs name was changed in 1949. In 1952 the team was invited to the games of the 2nd league as a representative of the Zielona Góra Province established two years earlier. "Stal" finished the season in last 10th place and was relegated after just one season. In 1955 the club changed its name to "Zastal". In February 1957 the clubs name was changed to "KS Lechia". The "Zgrzeblarek" sports club was also included in the structure of the new club. Kucera became the president, and the board was supplemented by: Wietrzyński, Gałka, Smerda and Marciniak.

In July 2019 Lechia was reactivated on the basis of the Falubaz football club and joined the III liga (group III).

References

Bibliography

External links
Official website (Polish)
Lechia Zielona Góra at the 90minut.pl website (Polish)

 
Football clubs in Zielona Góra
Association football clubs established in 1946
1946 establishments in Poland